Suneetha Ali (born 28 May 1977) is a Maldivian choreographer, actress and producer.

Early life
Suneetha Ali was born on 28 May 1977 in Aa. Ukulhas. Her father, is a fisherman while her mother is a homemaker. Ali spent most of her childhood, in a melodramatic environment, dancing to the tunes of songs from Bollywood. After her failed marriage, Ali, at the age of fourteen, relocated to Male' where she got exposed to the stage shows and music performances. A few months later, she participated in a local talent show, Galaxy where she danced to few Bollywood songs and her performance was criticized by the audience to the point where she was "booed off the stage". However, strong-willed, Ali "polished" her act a year later she was cast as a background dance in a television series.

Career
In 1994, Suneetha starred in the Mariyam Shauqee and Arifa Ibrahim-directed family drama Manzil (1994) which follows as an intelligent and hardworking orphan, whose life takes a dramatic turn while working as a servant in a reputed family. Apart from playing the role of Lubna in Amjad Ibrahim's television series, Dheben (1997), she was cast as a maid in his feature film Loabeega Aniyaa (1997) released in 1997. She next starred in Mariyam Shauqee's widely acclaimed family drama television series Kahthiri, where she played the friend of an indolent mother.

This was followed by her appearances in item songs of films including, Mila Handhuvaru (1998), Hiyy Halaaku (1998) and Hiiy Edhenee (2001). She then worked with Ibrahim for his children's horror films, Santhi Mariyanbu 1 (2001) and Safaru Kaiydha 1 (2001) where she played the titular roles in all of the installments. The following year, she collaborated with Amjad Ibrahim for his horror film Sandhuravirey (2002) which narrates the story of a female jinn aiming to win the heart of a human being. Featuring Shafeeu and Mariyam Nisha in lead roles, she played the role of a mentally retarded young woman. Upon release, the film received poor reviews from critics.

Personal life
At the age thirteen, Ali decided to marry her best-friend, to which her parents refused citing her young age. However, with the help of her neighbors and family members, she managed to convinces her parent for her marriage which lasted three months, when she filed for divorce as her husband disapproved her to play sports with boys of her age. 

In June 2013, while Ali was trying hard to move on with her 8 years old romantic relationship, which she breaks up herself an year ago, for discovering her boyfriends affair, gets amused by the news of Bollywood actor, Priyanka Chopra signing a film four days later to her father's demise, showing "remarkable display of resilience". Noting the progression from the actor, Ali started "idolizing" her from following her hairstyles to makeup to wardrobe collection. Soon, she started performing tributes to Chopra by singing, dancing and producing music videos of the her Hindi songs, dubbed in Dhivehi, which attracted several criticism from the locals and industry colleagues where she gets mocked by referring her as "Suniyanka". She recalls her engagement with Chopra at the music concert held in January 2015 as her "happiest day" in her life.

Filmography

Feature film

Short films

Television

Other work

Accolades

References 

Living people
1977 births
People from Malé
21st-century Maldivian actresses
Maldivian film actresses